is a Japanese actress. She won the Award for Best Supporting Actress at the 15th Yokohama Film Festival for Tsuge Yoshiharu World: Gensenkan Shujin.

Filmography
 Tsuge Yoshiharu World: Gensenkan Shujin (1993)
 Kamen Rider Hibiki (2005-2006)
 Kamen Rider Hibiki & The Seven Senki (2005)
 Kizumomo (2008)

References

1959 births
Living people
Japanese film actresses
Japanese television actresses
People from Yokohama